In ancient Greece, the title logographer was applied to two groups of people:

Logographer (history), chronicler and historian before Herodotus
Logographer (legal), professional legal speechwriter